The Individual Speedway Polish Championship (Polish: Indywidualne Mistrzostwa Polski, IMP) is an annual speedway event held each year organized by the Polish Motor Union (PZM) since 1932.

The current Polish Champion is Bartosz Zmarzlik (Stal Gorzów Wielkopolski) who won in 2022.Tomasz Gollob is the most successful rider in the history of the competition, having won it a record eight times.

Previous winners

Medals classification

References

 
Poland
Individual